Rino Lavezzini (born 20 February 1952) is an Italian football manager. He notably managed Genoa C.F.C. and also had spells in Lithuania and Romania.

References

1952 births
Living people
Italian football managers

Montevarchi Calcio Aquila 1902 managers
Carrarese Calcio managers
U.S. Catanzaro 1929 managers
Mantova 1911 managers
Genoa C.F.C. managers
FK Sūduva Marijampolė managers
FC Petrolul Ploiești managers
Italian expatriate football managers
Expatriate football managers in Lithuania
Expatriate football managers in Romania
Italian expatriate sportspeople in Lithuania
Italian expatriate sportspeople in Romania